A transplanter is an agricultural machine used for transplanting seedlings to the field. Transplanters greatly reduce time required to transplant seedlings compared to manual transplanting. Among the crops that are transplanted with transplanters are strawberries, vegetables, tomatoes, cabbages, tobacco and rice.

Semi-automatic mechanical transplanters are a common type, which can be self-propelled, or towed by a tractor at a low speed. A row of three to six operators feed seedlings from germination trays into hoppers which feed into the delivery mechanism.

Gallery

See also
Rice transplanter

Agricultural machinery